Luiz Fernando Silvestre Junior (born 29 March 2003), commonly known as Juninho, is a Brazilian footballer who plays as a midfielder for Athletico Paranaense.

Club career
Born in Assis, São Paulo, Juninho joined Athletico Paranaense's youth setup in 2017, from Trieste FC. On 7 May 2021, he renewed his contract with the club until April 2026.

Juninho made his first team debut on 1 September 2021, coming on as a late substitute for fellow youth graduate Khellven in a 1–1 Campeonato Paranaense home draw against FC Cascavel. He made his Série A debut on 3 October, replacing Carlos Eduardo late into a 0–3 away loss against Flamengo.

Career statistics

References

External links
Athletico Paranaense profile 

2003 births
Living people
Footballers from São Paulo (state)
Brazilian footballers
Association football midfielders
Campeonato Brasileiro Série A players
Campeonato Paranaense players
Club Athletico Paranaense players
People from Assis